Agonopterix doronicella is a moth of the family Depressariidae. It is found in France, Italy, Austria, the Czech Republic, Slovakia, Poland, Hungary, Romania, Bulgaria, North Macedonia, Albania, Bosnia and Herzegovina and Croatia.

The larvae feed on Doronicum austriacum.

References

External links
lepiforum.de

Moths described in 1849
Agonopterix
Moths of Europe